State Route 220 (SR 220) is a state highway in the U.S. state of California, defined to run between State Route 84 and State Route 160 on Ryer Island in the Sacramento–San Joaquin River Delta. At the eastern end of Ryer Island, the road crosses Steamboat Slough on the Howard Landing Ferry, a cable ferry.

Route description
The route begins at State Route 84 in Solano County. It then heads eastward and follows the Howard Landing Ferry across the Steamboat Slough to its east end at State Route 160 in Sacramento County.

SR 220 is not part of the National Highway System, a network of highways that are considered essential to the country's economy, defense, and mobility by the Federal Highway Administration.

Major intersections

See also

References

External links

California @ AARoads.com - State Route 220
Rio Vista–Ryde Loop driving tour
Caltrans: Route 220 highway conditions
California Highways: SR 220

220
State Route 220
State Route 220